Sagittaria trifolia, the threeleaf arrowhead or Chinese arrowhead, is a plant species widespread across the wet areas in Europe and in much of Asia.

Origin
It is native to Ukraine, European Russia, Siberia, the Russian Far East, Central Asia, China, India, Iran, Iraq, Japan, Korea, Pakistan, Indonesia, the Philippines and many smaller countries in between. It is also naturalized in the Fiji, Cook and Society Islands in the Pacific.

Usage
Sagittaria trifolia has underground tubers and is cultivated as a food crop in parts of Asia. The tubers are high in starch and highly nutritious.

References

trifolia
Flora of Eastern Europe
Flora of temperate Asia
Flora of tropical Asia
Edible plants
Chinese cuisine
Plants described in 1753
Taxa named by Carl Linnaeus